Australia competed at the 2014 Commonwealth Games in Glasgow, Scotland, between 23 July and 3 August 2014.

It was the nation's 20th appearance at the Commonwealth Games, having competed at every Games since their inception in 1930. 417 athletes competed for Australia, the largest team at the competition, just ahead of England with 416 athletes. It is also the greatest number of athletes to represent Australia at any Commonwealth Games.

Administration
In 2013, Steve Moneghetti was appointed as Chef de Mission, a position he held at the 2010 Commonwealth Games. Dianne Gallagher was appointed as Team General Manager. Brian Roe was appointed as Assistant Team General Manager, Dr Grace Bryant OAM as Team Medical Director and Ian Hanson as Team Media Director.

 Section Managers
 Nathan Sims (Athletics), Rhonda Cator (Badminton), Allan Nicolson Snr (Boxing), Paul Brosnan (Cycling), Michael Hetherington (Diving), Adam Sachs (Gymnastics),  Andrew Smith (Hockey Men), Ben Tarbox (Hockey Women),  Marie (Midge) Hill (Judo), Peter Brown (Lawn Bowls),  Julie Richardson (Netball), Luca Liussi (Rugby 7s), Tim Mahon (Shooting),   Michael Scott ( (Swimming), Scott Houston (Table Tennis), Bernard Savage (Triathlon), Robert Mitchell (Weightlifting), Alan Landy (Wrestling)
 Medical
 Doctors: Dr Michael Makdissi, Dr Sandra Mejak, Dr Hugh Seward and Dr Greg Lovell
 Physiotherapists: Peter Blanch (Head), Keren Faulkner, Jon Davis, Kylie Holt, Andrew McGough and Paula Peralta
 Soft Tissue Therapists: Tony Bond (Head), Howard Arbthnot, Stuart Hinds, Delwyn Griffith, Georgette (Georgie) Stephens and Natasha Brock
 Clinic Administrator: Linda Philpot
 Administration
 Athlete Liaison Officer: Petria Thomas OAM
 Administration Officers: Rohan Short, Andrew Matthews, Dianne O'Neill, Carol Grant, Robyn Shaw
 Administration Assistants: Amy Handley, Tim Arnold, Peter Tate, Cathy Perre, Emma Whitelaw
 Media
 Media Officers: Len Johnson, Tracy Parish, Lachlan Searle and David Moase

Medallists

| width="78%" align="left" valign="top" |

|style="text-align:left;width:22%;vertical-align:top;"|

* – Indicates the athlete competed in preliminaries but not the final

Athletics

Athletics Australia announced 103 athletes on 5 June 2014. Tristan Thomas (400m hurdles) was originally selected but withdrew due to injury. On 21 June, Brooke Stratton (long jump) revealed that she would not be able to compete due to injury. On 26 July 2014, Alex Rowe withdrew from 800m due to a hamstring injury.

Men
Track & road events

Field events

Combined events – Decathlon

Women
Track & road events

Field events

Combined events – Heptathlon

– Katherine Katsanevakis replaced Kelly Hetherington who withdrew due to injury.

Officials:
Simon Nathan (head of delegation)
Eric Hollingsworth (head coach)
Nathan Sims (section manager)
Sharon Hannan (assistant section managers)
Andrew Faichney (assistant section managers)

Badminton 

Badminton Australia announced a team of 10 athletes on 5 June 2014.

Singles & doubles

Officials: Head Coach – Lasse Bundgaard, Coach – Ricky Yu, Section Manager -Rhonda Cator

Mixed team

Pool D

Quarterfinals

Boxing

Boxing Australia announced a team of 11 boxers on 28 May 2014.

Men

Women

Officials: Head Coach – Kevin Smith, Assistant coach – Don Abnett, Section Manager – Allan Nicholson

Cycling

Cycling Australia announced a team of 41 athletes on 10gicke 2014.

Road
Men

Women

Track
Sprint

Pursuit

Time trial

Points race

Scratch race

Keirin

Mountain Bike

Diving

Diving Australia announced a team of 12 athletes on 12 April 2014.

Men

Women

Gymnastics

Gymnastics Australia announced a team of 10 artistic gymnasts on 25 May 2014 and 3 rhythmic gymnasts on 1 June.

Artistic
Men
Team

Individual

Women
Team

Individual

Rhythmic
Team

Individual

Hockey

Hockey Australia announced a team of 32 players on 24 June 2014.

Men

Daniel Beale
Kiel Brown
Andrew Charter
Chris Ciriello
Matt Gohdes
Kieran Govers
Fergus Kavanagh
Mark Knowles
Trent Mitton
Eddie Ockenden
Simon Orchard
Andrew Philpott
Matthew Swann
Jake Whetton
Tristan White
Aran Zalewski

Head coaches Graham Reid and Paul Gaudoin
Assistant coach Ben Bishop

Pool A

Semifinal

Gold medal match

Women

Madonna Blyth
Edwina Bone
Jane Claxton
Casey Eastham
Anna Flanagan
Kate Jenner
Jodie Kenny
Rachael Lynch
Karri McMahon
Georgia Nanscawen
Ashleigh Nelson
Georgie Parker
Brooke Peris
Emily Smith
Jayde Taylor
Kellie White

Head coach Adam Commens
Assistant coaches Jason Duff and Mark Hickman

Pool B

Semifinal

Gold medal match

Judo

Judo Federation of Australia announced a team of 13 athletes on 30 May 2014.

Men
{| class="wikitable" style="font-size:90%;"
|-
!rowspan=2|Athlete
!rowspan=2|Event
!Round of 32
!Round of 16
!Quarterfinals
!Semifinals
!Repechage
!colspan=2|Final/
|- style="font-size:95%"
!OppositionResult
!OppositionResult
!OppositionResult
!OppositionResult
!OppositionResult
!OppositionResult
!Rank
|- align=center
|align=left|Tom Pappas
|align=left|-60 kg
|
|L 000 – 002
|colspan=5|did not advance
|-align=center
|align=left|Steven Brown
|align=left|-66 kg
|
|L 000 – 110
|colspan=5|did not advance
|-align=center
|align=left|Jake Bensted
|align=left rowspan=2|-73 kg
|
|''W 100 – 000
|W 100 – 000
|L 000 – 000
|
|W 100 – 000
|
|-align=center
|align=left|Arnie Dickins
|
|L 001 – 010
|colspan=5|did not advance
|-align=center
|align=left|Mark Anthony
|align=left|-90 kg
|
|W 102 – 001
|W 011 – 000
|L 000 – 010
|
| L 0021 – 0010
|4
|-align=center
|align=left|Duke Didier
|align=left|-100 kg
|
|
|L 000 – 100
|Did not advance
|W 100 – 000
|  L0001 – 0003
|4
|-align=center
|align=left|Jake Andrewartha|align=left|+100 kg
|
|
|W 100 – 010
|L 000 – 100
|
|  W 1001 – 0000
|
|}

Women

Lawn Bowls

Bowls Australia announced a team of 17 athletes.

Men

Women

Mixed para-sport

Officials:Section Manager – Peter Brown, National Coach – Steve Glasson, Assistant Coach – Robert Dobbins, Para-sport Coach – Gary Willis, Team Manager – Faye Luke

Netball

Netball Australia announced a team of 12 athletes.
Team – Laura Geitz (captain), Bianca Chatfield (vice-captain), Caitlin Bassett, Tegan Caldwell, Julie Corletto, Kimberlee Green, Renae Hallinan, Sharni Layton, Natalie Medhurst, Kimberley Ravaillion, Madison Robinson, Caitlin Thwaites 
Officials: Section Manager – Julie Richardson, Head Coach – Lisa Alexander, Assistant Coach – Michelle den Dekker, Coach – Margaret Caldow, Physiotherapist – Steven Hawkins.

Pool B

Semifinal

Gold medal game

Rugby Sevens

Australian Rugby Union announced a team of 12 athletes on 7 July 2014. 
Team – Cameron Clark, Tom Cusack, Pama Fou, Con Foley, Liam Gill, Greg Jeloudev, Tom Lucas, Sean McMahon, Sam Mayers, James Stannard

Pool D

Quarterfinal

Semifinal

Bronze medal match

Shooting

Shooting Australia announced a team of 29 athletes.

Men
Pistol/Small bore

Shotgun

Full bore

Women
Pistol/Small bore

Shotgun

Squash

Squash Australia announced a team of 10 athletes.

Individual

Doubles

Officials: Section Manager –  ; Coaches – Sarah Fitz-Gerald, Rodney Eyles

Swimming

After the 2014 Australian Championships and Commonwealth Games Trials, Swimming Australia announced a team of 59 athletes.

Men

Women

Qualifiers for the latter rounds (Q''') of all events were decided on a time only basis, therefore positions shown are overall results versus competitors in all heats.
* – Indicates athlete swam in the preliminaries but not in the final race.

Eamon Sullivan withdrew due to injury on 6 June and was replaced by Matthew Abood. Meagen Nay and Jacqueline Freney withdrew due to injury and illness on 7 July and were replaced by Madison Wilson and Lakeisha Patterson respectively.

Officials:   Head of Delegation – Michael Scott, National Head Coach – Jacco Verhaeren, Coaches – Brant Best, Peter Bishop, Matthew Brown, Simon Cusack, John Fowlie, Rob Hindmarsh, Craig Jackson, Chris Mooney, Vince Raleigh, Richard Scarce, Rohan Taylor

Table tennis

Table Tennis Australia selected a team of 10 athletes.

Men

Women

Mixed

Officials: Section Manager – Scott Houston, Head Coach – Jens Lang, Assistant Coach – Nam Ho Oh

Triathlon

Triathlon Australia selected a team of 6 athletes.

Mixed Relay

Weightlifting

Weightlifting Australia announced a team of 19 athletes on 18 March 2014.

Men

Women

 Powerlifting

Officials:
Dr Robin Mitchell (section manager)
Michael Keelan (head coach)
Jourik Sarkisian (coach)
Miles Wydall (coach)
Anthony Dove (coach)
Scott Upston (EAD Powerlifting)
William Nancarrow ( EAD Powerlifting coach)

Wrestling

Wrestling Australia announced a team of nine athletes on 30 May 2014.
Only freestyle wrestling events are being held in Glasgow.

Men

Women

See also
 Australia at the 2012 Summer Olympics
 Australia at the 2016 Summer Olympics

References

External links
Glasgow 2014 Commonwealth Games Official site
Australian Commonwealth Games Association Glasgow 2014 Information
Australian Team Handbook 2014 Glasgow Commonwealth Games – profiles of all Australian athletes

2014
Nations at the 2014 Commonwealth Games
Commonwealth Games